Jeff Tarte (born September 1, 1956) is an American politician who served in the North Carolina Senate from the 41st district from 2013 to 2019. A member of the Republican Party, Tarte was defeated by Democrat Natasha Marcus in the 2018 election.

References

1956 births
Living people
Republican Party North Carolina state senators
People from Cornelius, North Carolina